Juan Gálvez may refer to:

 Juan Gálvez (racing driver) (1916–1963), Argentine racing driver
 Juan Gálvez (painter) (1774–1846), Spanish artist
 Juan Gálvez (bishop) (died 1507), Spanish Roman Catholic prelate
 Juan Manuel Gálvez (1887–1972), president of Honduras

See also
 Juan Manuel Gálvez International Airport, Honduras